First Assembly Christian school (FACS) is a private, college preparatory Christian school located in the Cordova section of Memphis, Tennessee. FACS was founded in 1972; programs for kindergarten through Grade 8 began in 1972 and grades 9-12 were added in 1975. The school is fully accredited by the Southern Association of Colleges and Schools. First Assembly is also a member of the Association of Christian Schools International, Southern Association of Independent Schools, Tennessee Association of Independent Schools, Memphis Association of Independent Schools, and the College Board.  Though strongly supported by First Assembly of God Church, of the Assemblies of God, the school's website identifies itself as Non-denominational Christian.

History
According to the historian Marcus Pohlmann, FACS was established in 1970 as part of a wave of private schools formed by white parents seeking to avoid sending their children to racially integrated public schools.

Campuses

Original
Originally located in East Memphis, the  campus contained classrooms, a gymnasium and a sanctuary, which was also used for chapel services, theatre productions, graduations and assemblies.  This campus was sold and later was the home of the former Crichton College.

Cordova
In 1999, the school, and host church, relocated to the Cordova, Tennessee, area in Eastern Shelby County. The campus contains facilities for grades pre-K through 12, and in addition a complete sportsplex. The building also contains twenty-five regular classrooms, a computer lab, two science labs, a science lecture lab, a library/media center, a cafeteria, a multi-purpose room, and an area of the school designed specifically for the fine arts. The gymnasium contains locker rooms, a fully furnished weight room, and a wrestling area. The sportsplex contains a football stadium, baseball stadium, and softball stadium. In addition the stadium contains a field house and a concessions building. The junior high will be moving into a recently finished building on the FACS campus on March 16, 2009. The new building includes offices, a lobby, six junior high classrooms, a band room, a choir room, a gymnasium with a mezzanine, a cafeteria, two sets of locker rooms, and several band and choir practice rooms. The new gymnasium, which is several thousand square feet in size, will be used by the junior high and high school teams.

Junior High
The junior high moved into a new building on the main campus on Monday, March 30, 2009. There are monthly junior high chapels along with CONNECT groups. As of February 13, 2009, there have been two editions of the new junior high newspaper, the Sader Paper, which is run by students.

Athletics
First Assembly Christian School has fielded varsity sports teams since the mid-1970s. The school's team name is the Crusaders. FACS competes in Division 2, for private schools, in the Tennessee Secondary School Athletic Association.

Fine arts
The Fine Arts department lists accomplishments including: artists placing in various competitions, the honors band talent winner performance, the choir, and the theater's productions. There are plans to possibly build a fine arts theater in or near the new campus building.

References

Christian schools in Tennessee
Educational institutions established in 1972
Preparatory schools in Tennessee
Private K-12 schools in Tennessee
Segregation academies in Tennessee
Schools in Memphis, Tennessee